Hierodula chinensis is a species of praying mantis in the family Mantidae.

Distribution 
China and Korea

References

chinensis
Articles created by Qbugbot
Insects described in 1929